Rosenbergite is a mineral with the chemical formula AlF3·3H2O.  It is a trihydrate of aluminium fluoride.

It is colorless. Its crystals are tetragonal to dipyramidal. It is named after Philip E. Rosenberg, a United States geochemist. It is found in the Celtine Mine in Tuscany, Italy and Mount Erebus, Ross Island, Antarctica. It is not radioactive. Rosenbergite is rated 3–3.5 on the Mohs Scale.

References

External links
Webmineral - Rosenbergite
Mindat.org - Rosenbergite
Handbook of Mineralogy - Rosenbergite

Aluminium minerals
Fluorine minerals
Tetragonal minerals
Minerals in space group 85